Darío Ripoll Herrera (San Pedro Garza García; May 16, 1970) is a Mexican actor and dubbling

Career 
Darío Ripoll studied a Bachelor of Acting at the National School of Theater Art of the INBA. He has taken acting training courses and acting specialization in cinema, with the directors: Nacho Ortíz, Joaquin Bissner and Luis Felipe Tovar.

On television he has participated in soap operas such as:  La fea más bella, Yo amo a Juan Querendón, Alma de Hierro, A lucky family  and in series such as  The Simulators, Thirteen Fears, Los héroes del norte, Hermanos y Detectives, Addicts , XY, Mujeres Asesinas 3, La Familia Peluche (third season), 

Since 2005 he was in Vecinos where he played Luis San Román with Mayrin Villanueva, Macaria, Octavio Ocaña, Pablo Valentín, Manuel "Flaco" Ibáñez and Ana Bertha Espín.

In 2012 his participed in the telenovela "Porque el amor manda"  together with Fernando Colunga, Blanca Soto, Erick Elías, Alejandro Avila, Jeimy Osorio, Ricardo Margaleff, Violeta Isfel among ithers.

 Filmography 
 Telenovelas 

 TV series 

  Forever Joan Sebastian  (2016) – Chucho Rendón
 Nosotros los guapos (2016) – Role special (Season 1 Episode:La imigración)
  Logout  (2015) – Harmony
  The Plush Family  (2012) – Plush Police
  Star2  (2012) – Various characters
 Los Simuladores (2008) – Partner of the construction company
   Vecinos  (2005–2008/2012/2017–present) – Luis San Román
  Furcio  (2000–2002)

 Dubbing 

  Batman: Arkham Origins  (2013) – Joker (voice)
  Batman: Arkham Knight '' (2015) – Joker (voice)

References

External Links 

1970 births
Living people
Mexican male film actors
Mexican male telenovela actors
Male actors from Monterrey